Gartnait son of Foith or son of Uuid (died 635) was a king of the Picts from 631 to 635.

The Pictish Chronicle king lists give him a reign of four years, corresponding with the Irish annals, although variants say five and eight years.

His death is reported by the Annals of Ulster for 637. He was followed by his brother Bridei son of Uuid according to the king lists. A third brother, Talorc, was king after Bruide.

References
 Anderson, Alan Orr, Early Sources of Scottish History A.D 500–1286, volume 1. Reprinted with corrections. Paul Watkins, Stamford, 1990.

External links
CELT: Corpus of Electronic Texts at University College Cork includes the Annals of Ulster, Tigernach, the Four Masters and Innisfallen, the Chronicon Scotorum, the Lebor Bretnach (which includes the Duan Albanach), Genealogies, and various Saints' Lives. Most are translated into English, or translations are in progress.
Pictish Chronicle 

635 deaths
Pictish monarchs
7th-century Scottish monarchs
Year of birth unknown